Bjelland may refer to:

People
Bjelland (surname), a list of people with the surname Bjelland

Places
Bjelland, a village in Marnardal municipality in Vest-Agder county, Norway
Bjelland, Flekkefjord, a village in Flekkefjord municipality in Vest-Agder county, Norway
Bjelland (municipality), a former municipality in Vest-Agder county, Norway
Bjelland og Grindum, a former municipality in Vest-Agder county, Norway
Bjelland Church, a church in Marnardal municipality in Vest-Agder county, Norway
Bjelland Point, a headland on the island of South Georgia of the British territory of South Georgia and the South Sandwich Islands